Paul Messier may refer to:

Paul Messier (art conservator) (born 1962), art conservator
Paul Messier (ice hockey) (born 1958), hockey player